Bidenichthys beeblebroxi is a species of common reef fish of the family Bythitidae, and one of three species in the genus Bidenichthys. The species is found in the coastal waters off North Island and northern South Island, New Zealand. The species was described by Paulin in 1995.

The species was named after the character Zaphod Beeblebrox in Douglas Adams' The Hitchhiker's Guide to the Galaxy.

The common names gray or grey brotula and orange cuskeel were used to describe Bidenichthys consobrinus (F. W. Hutton, 1876) prior to Paulin's 1995 redescription of B. consobrinus and description of B. beeblebroxi, in which Paulin referred to "the common grey brotula, here described as a new species [B. beeblebroxi], and Hutton's consobrinus...".

References

Bythitidae
Endemic marine fish of New Zealand
Taxa named by Christopher David Paulin
Fish described in 1995
The Hitchhiker's Guide to the Galaxy